Janka, typically a given name or a surname, is a form of the originally Hebrew language name "Yohanan" (meaning "God is merciful").  
Notable people with the name include:

Surname:
 Carlo Janka (born 1986), Swiss alpine ski racer 
 Les Janka, American consultant
 Gabriel Janka (1864–1932), Austrian wood researcher
 Victor von Janka (1837-1900), Hungarian botanist
 Walter Janka (1914–1994), German publisher

Given name:
 Janka Bryl (1917–2006), Belarusian writer
 Janka Gabor (1896-1997), Austrio-Hungarian Countess de Szigethy, mother of Magda, Zsa Zsa and Eva Gabor
 Yanka Dyagileva (1966–1991), Russian poet and singer-songwriter
 Yanka Kupala, also known as Janka Kupała, (1882–1942), Belarusian poet and writer
 Yanka Maur, also known as Janka Maŭr, (1883–1971), Belarusian writer
 Ahmed Janka Nabay, Sierra Leonean musician

External links 
 Distribution of the name Janka in USA

Surnames from given names